Sebastian Hähnge (born 11 March 1978 in Magdeburg) is a retired German footballer.

Career

Hähnge began his career with his hometown club, 1. FC Magdeburg, and had spells with Chemnitzer FC and Dynamo Dresden before, in July 2003, he decided to take a break from football to go backpacking in Australia. He returned to the game in March 2004, joining FC Carl Zeiss Jena, and moved onto Hansa Rostock in 2006, having finished second top scorer in the Regionalliga. Hansa were promoted to the Bundesliga in his first season at the club. In July 2008, he moved back to FC Carl Zeiss Jena, where he remained for four years, retiring after their relegation from the 3. Liga in 2012. He returned to football again a year later to sign for Viktoria Berlin of the Regionalliga Nordost.

References

External links
 

1978 births
Living people
German footballers
Association football forwards
1. FC Magdeburg players
Chemnitzer FC players
Dynamo Dresden players
FC Carl Zeiss Jena players
FC Hansa Rostock players
Bundesliga players
2. Bundesliga players
3. Liga players
FC Viktoria 1889 Berlin players
Sportspeople from Magdeburg